Pothukurru is a village of Ainavilli Mandal in East Godavari district in the state of Andhra Pradesh in India. It is a part of the P.Gannavaram Assembly Constituency and the Amalapuram Lok Sabha Constituency.

Geography 
Pothukurru is located near . It has an average elevation of 1 meter.

References 

Villages in East Godavari district